Mateo Hrvatsko Poljak (born 10 September 1989) is a Croatian footballer who last played as a Defensive midfielder for Mt Druitt Town Rangers.

Club career

Croatia
After going through the youth ranks of Dinamo Zagreb, Poljak was moved to their feeder team Lokomotiva Zagreb, then playing in the Druga HNL. After a season there he signed a 7-year contract with the club, which was taken over by Dinamo at the beginning of 2010. He spent the next two and a half seasons on loan at NK Lokomotiva, however, before his contract was terminated in the summer of 2012.

Western Sydney Wanderers
On 13 August 2012 it was announced that Poljak had signed with the newly formed A-League club Western Sydney Wanderers. He signed an initial two-year contract, set to expire in July 2014. In his first season with Western Sydney, he made 25 appearances, a mainstay of the side's midfield, scoring one goal and helping the Wanderers win the A-League premiership in the club's first season. On 5 September 2013, Poljak signed a two-year extension with the club, the new contract ending mid 2016.

Poljak again in his second season with Western Sydney was a constant starter throughout with his side finishing the league in second position. He was also a part of the side that won the 2014 AFC Champions League, later going on to compete in the 2014 FIFA Club World Cup.

Newcastle Jets
In 2015, Poljak was not retained by the Wanderers and joined Newcastle United Jets FC.

Personal life
Poljak is married to Katarina, and has a daughter, Mia.

Career statistics

1 – includes A-League final series statistics
2 – AFC Champions League statistics are included in season ending during group stages (i.e. ACL 2014 and A-League season 2013–2014 etc.)

Honours
Western Sydney Wanderers
AFC Champions League: 2014

References

External links
Western Sydney Wanderers profile

1989 births
Living people
Footballers from Zagreb
Association football midfielders
Croatian footballers
Croatia youth international footballers
NK Lokomotiva Zagreb players
Western Sydney Wanderers FC players
Newcastle Jets FC players
FC Astra Giurgiu players
Marconi Stallions FC players
Sutherland Sharks FC players
Croatian Football League players
A-League Men players
Liga I players
Croatian expatriate footballers
Expatriate soccer players in Australia
Croatian expatriate sportspeople in Australia
Expatriate footballers in Romania
Croatian expatriate sportspeople in Romania